The Wiltshire Archaeological and Natural History Society was founded in 1853, and is one of the largest county-based archaeological societies in the United Kingdom.  It runs the Wiltshire Museum in Devizes, Wiltshire which has the best Bronze Age collections in Britain, including finds from Avebury and Stonehenge. It also publishes the Wiltshire Archaeological and Natural History Magazine.

A history of the society was published in 1953, under the title The Wiltshire Archaeological and Natural History Society: 1853–1952: a centenary history.

As well as continuing to publish an approximately annual journal, the Wiltshire Archaeological and Natural History Magazine, the society has in the past published books of Wiltshire interest, such as the Tropenell Cartulary. The present-day Wiltshire Record Society began life as the Wiltshire Archaeological and Natural History Society Records Branch.

Notable officers 
 George Scrope – first President
 Robert Awdry – President 1936–1946, Chairman until his death in 1949
 Margaret Guido – Vice President from 1984, Co-President 1987–1994
 Stuart Piggott – Co-President 1987–1996

References

External links
 

Archaeology of England
Organisations based in Wiltshire
Archaeological organizations
Natural history societies